Penicillium megasporum is a species in the genus Penicillium which produces xanthomegin, verrucosidin, roquefortine C and penitrem A. Penicillium megasporum occurs in grain

References

Further reading 
 

melanoconidium
Fungi described in 2004